Nukan (also Romanized as Nūkān, Nookan, Nowkān; also known as Naūkān) is a village in Dorudfaraman Rural District, in the Central District of Kermanshah County, Kermanshah Province, Iran. At the 2006 census, its population was 10,377, in 2,563 families.

References 

Populated places in Kermanshah County